"Hang On to Your Life" is a song written by Burton Cummings and Kurt Winter and performed by The Guess Who.  The song is featured on their 1970 album, Share the Land. The producer was Jack Richardson and the arrangement was by The Guess Who.
On the 8-track tape edition of Share the Land, the song was edited to make it a bit longer in order to fill out the timing on the first channel (a few extra measures appear before each verse).

Background
This song is an anti-drug message. In the chorus section, the phrase: "Oh Life", is repeated a few times, in an echo that fades falsely, depicting a heartbeat. ("Oh Life, Oh Life, Oh Life"). Before the song's ending, the "Oh" in the phrase is heard stronger, with the repeated phrase fading in the spoken coda section.

At the end of the album version Cummings recites verses 13-15 of Psalm 22.  The single version ends just before he speaks.

Chart performance
It reached #5 in Canada and #43 on the Billboard Hot 100 in 1971.  It was also released in the United Kingdom as a single, but it did not chart.

References

1970 songs
1970 singles
Songs written by Burton Cummings
Songs written by Kurt Winter
The Guess Who songs
Song recordings produced by Jack Richardson (record producer)
RCA Victor singles